Eugenio Perego (1876–1944) was an Italian film director of the silent era. During the 1920s he directed a number of comedy films starring Leda Gys.

Selected filmography
 The Two Sergeants (1913)
 The Railway Owner (1919)
 A Woman's Story (1920)
 Chief Saetta (1924)
 Naples is a Song (1927)

References

Bibliography
 Abel, Richard. Encyclopedia of Early Cinema. Taylor & Francis, 2005.

External links

1876 births
1944 deaths
Italian film directors
Film people from Milan